Jamel Chisholm (born 11 August 1995) is a Jamaican former rugby league footballer, who played as a er for Hunslet Hawks, Featherstone Rovers, Hemel Stags, York City Knights, London Skolars and Oldham.

He is also a former rugby union player.

Background
Chisholm was born in Chapeltown, Leeds, England.

Career
Chisholm has previously played for the Hunslet Hawks on dual-registration from the Leeds Rhinos. He has also played for the Featherstone Rovers, Hemel Stags, York City Knights and the London Skolars.

Chisholm was Super League's fastest man.

Chisholm has played rugby union for Leeds Carnegie.

References

External links
Oldham R.L.F.C. profile
Hunslet Hawks profile
York City Knights profile

It’s Rugby profile
Statbunker stats

1995 births
Living people
English people of Jamaican descent
Jamaican rugby league players
English rugby league players
English rugby union players
Featherstone Rovers players
Footballers who switched code
Hemel Stags players
Hunslet R.L.F.C. players
Leeds Rhinos players
Leeds Tykes players
London Skolars players
Oldham R.L.F.C. players
Rugby league players from Leeds
Rugby league wingers
Rugby union players from Leeds
York City Knights players